Arshad Ali Chaudhry (April 10, 1950 – June 11, 2015) was an international field hockey player from Pakistan. He is son of Chaudhry Sadique Salar, the nephew of Chaudhry Ghulam Rasool, and cousin of Akhtar Rasool. Chaudhry was born in Faisalabad (formerly Lyallpur) District of Punjab, Pakistan. He earned his B.A. from Government College Faislabad where he was also the captain of college hockey team. He got an M.A. in history from Punjab University, Lahore in 1973. In 1975 he was selected Assistant Manager in PIA.

Chaudhry was selected for the Punjab University Hockey team in 1971 for the Inter-Varsity Hockey Championship held at Karachi. The team won the Inter-Varsity Championship the following year. Chaudhry remained an active hockey international player in the Pakistani national team from 1971 through 1976 and played as right half-back. He represented Pakistan in over 33 national and international matches. He represented Pakistani Men's hockey team which participated in the 1975 third World Cup Hockey, held at Kuala Lumpur and won the Silver Medal. In 1976 he participated in the 1976 Summer Olympics held at Montreal and won a bronze medal. He retired from active hockey after the Montreal Olympics in 1976 and died in June 2015 at the age of 65.

References

External links
 
 

1950 births
2015 deaths
Pakistani male field hockey players
Olympic field hockey players of Pakistan
Olympic bronze medalists for Pakistan
Olympic medalists in field hockey
Medalists at the 1976 Summer Olympics
Field hockey players at the 1976 Summer Olympics
Asian Games medalists in field hockey
Field hockey players at the 1974 Asian Games
Asian Games gold medalists for Pakistan
Medalists at the 1974 Asian Games